New York's 2nd State Assembly district is one of the 150 districts in the New York State Assembly. It has been represented by Jodi Giglio since 2021, replacing Anthony Palumbo.

Geography
District 2 is located entirely within Suffolk County, comprising the northern portion of the county. It includes portions of the town of Brookhaven, and the towns of Riverhead and Southold.

Recent election results

2022

2020

2018

2016

2014

2013 special

2012

References 

2
Suffolk County, New York